Yanaqucha (Quechua yana black, very dark, qucha lake, "black lake", hispanicized spelling Yanacocha) is a lake in Peru located in the Pasco Region, Pasco Province, Huayllay District. Yanaqucha lies between Waskaqucha in the west and Lake Junin in the east. The lake belongs to the watershed of the Mantaro River. 

The dam is operated by Electroperu.

References 

Lakes of Peru
Lakes of Pasco Region
Dams in Peru
Buildings and structures in Pasco Region